Alverno Heights Academy, formerly Alverno High School, is an independent, Catholic, College-prep high school for girls located in Sierra Madre, California, near Pasadena. The school is on the former Villa del Sol d’Oro estate. Due to Alverno High's unique architecture and grounds the school has been used in many TV shows and movies, also weddings. On February 21, 2023, Alverno's trustees announced that its high school ("Upper School") will close on June 2, 2023. The K-8 "Lower School" will remain open.

History
The school building and grounds, were part of Villa del Sol d’Oro, owned and built by Dr. Walter Jarvis Barlow and his wife Marion Brooks Barlow in 1924. Dr. Walter had architect Wallace Neff build the Italian Villa, completed in 1928. The Villa is a two-thirds scale replica of the 1534 Villa Collazzi near Florence, Italy.

The couple raise three children at the villa. Dr. Barlow was from New York and opened a tuberculosis sanatorium in Echo Park, Los Angeles in 1902, this later became the Barlow Respiratory Hospital. Dr. Barlow died in 1937 of tuberculosis. Five years after Walter died in 1942, Marion sold Villa del Sol d’Oro and its 13-acres to the Sisters of St. Francis, followers of St. Francis of Assisi. The Sisters hoped to use the Villa, now called "Provincial Center," as a convent, from which to provide education, childcare, and health care to Catholic immigrants in and around Sierra Madre. The Sisters, seeing a need for education for young women, started an all-girls high school originally called "Alverno Heights Academy," with classes beginning in 1960. The school added athletics and community service and other activities over the years. In 1978, the Sisters of St. Francis formally turned the school and property over to another religious order, the Board of the Immaculate Heart Community, the current legal sponsors of Alverno.

In 1982–83, the exterior shots for the NBC TV mini series "V" made use of the school and Villa for the Alien headquarters.

In the Summer of 2016 Lady Bird (film) was filmed at Alverno Heights Academy as a stand in for the Sacramento all girls Catholic high school St. Francis High School (Sacramento, California).

In 2016 Alverno High School changed its name back to its original name Alverno Heights Academy.

Citing a 50% decrease in enrollment over the prior decade, the school plans to close its "Upper School" (high school) on June 2, 2023. The coed K-8 "Lower School" will remain open.

See also
Episcopal Church of the Ascension (Sierra Madre, California)
Old North Church (Sierra Madre, California)
Sierra Madre Memorial Park
Sierra Madre Pioneer Cemetery

References

External links
 Alverno Heights Academy
 

Roman Catholic secondary schools in Los Angeles County, California
Educational institutions established in 1960
Girls' schools in California
High schools in Los Angeles County, California
1960 establishments in California
Sierra Madre, California
Catholic secondary schools in California